Vasyl Pryima (born 10 June 1991) is a Ukrainian professional footballer who plays as a central defender.

Club career

Early career
He is the product of the Metalurh Donetsk Youth school system. After Metalurh Donetsk went bankrupt in July 2015 he was let go.

Torino
On 18 October 2015, he signed with Torino until June 2016 with an option to extend his contract for an additional two years.

He was called up for the first time on 31 October 2015, during the Turin derby, remaining on the bench for the full 90 minutes. In December he made his debut with the Granata in a Coppa Italia fixture won 4–1 against Cesena.

Frosinone
In February 2016, he moved on loan to Frosinone, and called up for the first time in a match won 1–0 against Bologna, remaining on the bench. He made his debut in Serie A as a starter in the 29th round, in a relegation tie against Carpi.

On 28 June 2016, Frosinone announced that they had signed Pryima on a free transfer following the non-renewal of his contract with Torino

International career
He was called up to the Ukraine national under-21 football team in November 2009.

References

External links
 Profile on Football Squads
 
 
 

1991 births
Living people
People from Novoyavorivsk
Ukrainian footballers
Ukraine youth international footballers
Ukraine under-21 international footballers
FC Metalurh Donetsk players
Ukrainian Premier League players
Torino F.C. players
Ukrainian expatriate footballers
Serie A players
Expatriate footballers in Italy
Ukrainian expatriate sportspeople in Italy
Frosinone Calcio players
FC Zorya Luhansk players
Association football defenders
FC Shakhtyor Soligorsk players
Expatriate footballers in Belarus
Ukrainian expatriate sportspeople in Belarus
FC Karpaty Lviv players
FC Chornomorets Odesa players
Sportspeople from Lviv Oblast